Lists of dictionaries cover general and specialized dictionaries, collections of words in one or more specific languages, and collections of terms in specialist fields. They are organized by language, specialty and other properties.

By language

 List of Arabic dictionaries
 List of Croatian dictionaries
 List of Czech dictionaries
 List of Dutch dictionaries
 List of English dictionaries
 List of French dictionaries
 List of German dictionaries
 List of Hebrew dictionaries
 List of Hokkien dictionaries
 List of Japanese dictionaries
 List of Scottish Gaelic dictionaries

By specialty

 List of Bible dictionaries
 List of biographical dictionaries
 List of biographical dictionaries of women writers in English
 Bibliography of encyclopedias: general biographies
 Etymological dictionary
 List of nautical dictionaries
 List of Scarecrow Press historical dictionaries
 Gazetteer#List of gazetteers

Other

 List of online dictionaries
 List of Wiktionaries
 List of dictionaries by number of words

See also
List of almanacs
Lists of encyclopedias
List of libraries

Reference material lists